"This Time I'm Free" is a song by Sweden-based musician and producer Dr. Alban, released in 1995 as the first single from his fourth studio album, Born in Africa (1996). It features vocals by singer Martina Edoff and charted in many European countries, peaking at number two in Finland, number three in Sweden, number ten in Denmark and number eleven in Norway. On the Eurochart Hot 100, it reached number 22 in September 1995.

Music video
The accompanying music video for "This Time I'm Free" was directed by Jonathan Bate. It was made in black-and-white and starts with the message "last year in Africa alone more than 12.000 people were held prisoner without charges - amnesty 1995". In the end the message "freedom is a right and not a privilege" appear. The video was later published on Dr. Alban's official YouTube channel in December 2011. It has amassed more than 257,000 views as of September 2021. Bate also directed the videos for "Look Who's Talking", "Away from Home" and "Let the Beat Go On".

Track listing

Charts

Weekly charts

Year-end charts

La Cream version

In 1999, Swedish Eurodance band La Cream released a cover on the song, as "Free". It was released as the fourth single from their debut album, Sound & Vision (1998). This version peaked at number 12 in Sweden, with a total of six weeks on the chart. Dr. Alban produced the song with Ferari Zand. The accompanying music video sees the singer, Tess Mattisson, escaping from prison.

Charts

References

1995 singles
1995 songs
Black-and-white music videos
CNR Music singles
Dr. Alban songs
English-language Swedish songs
Music videos directed by Jonathan Bate
Number-one singles in Finland
Songs written by Ari Lehtonen
Songs written by Dr. Alban